The Girl Spy Before Vicksburg is an American silent film produced by Kalem Company and directed by Sidney Olcott with Gene Gauntier, Robert Vignola and JP McGowan. A copy of this film is held at the EYE Filmmuseum in Amsterdam.

Cast
 Gene Gauntier as Nan, the Girl Spy
 Robert Vignola 
 JP McGowan 
 Jack J. Clark

Plot 
"In the absence of men, a Civil War commander asks his daughter (The Girl Spy) to sabotage a gunpowder transport. The girl disguises herself as a soldier and completes her task. After a dangerous escape, she returns to her crying mother."

Production notes
The film was shot in Jacksonville, Florida. The film was written by Gauntier.

References

External links
 
  The Girl Spy Before Vicksburg website dedicated to Sidney Olcott
 Film at YouTube

1910 films
American war drama films
American silent short films
Films set in Florida
Films shot in Jacksonville, Florida
Films directed by Sidney Olcott
1910 short films
1910s war drama films
American black-and-white films
1910 drama films
1910s American films
Silent American drama films
Silent war drama films